The 2016–17 Oklahoma Sooners basketball team represented the University of Oklahoma in the 2016–17 NCAA Division I men's basketball season. The Sooners were led by Lon Kruger in his sixth season. They played their home games at the Lloyd Noble Center in Norman, Oklahoma as a member of the Big 12 Conference. They finished the season 11–20, 5–13 in Big 12 play to finish in ninth place. They lost in the first round of the Big 12 tournament to TCU.

Previous season
The Sooners finished the 2015–16 season 29–8, 12–6 in Big 12 play to finish in third place in conference. They defeated Oklahoma State in the quarterfinals of the Big 12 tournament before losing to West Virginia in the semifinals. The Sooners received an at-large bid to the NCAA tournament where they defeated Cal State Bakersfield, VCU, Texas A&M, and Oregon to advance to the Final Four for the fifth time in school history. At the Final Four, they lost in the national semifinal to the eventual champion Villanova by 44 points, the largest margin in Final Four history.

Following the season, senior guard and player of the year winner Buddy Hield graduated and was selected as the sixth overall pick in the NBA Draft by the New Orleans Pelicans.

Departures

Incoming transfers

Recruits

2017 Recruits

Roster

Schedule

|-
! colspan=9 style="background:#960018; color:#FFFDD0;"| Exhibition

|-
! colspan=9 style="background:#960018; color:#FFFDD0;"| Regular season

|-
! colspan=9 style="background:#960018; color:#FFFDD0;"| Big 12 tournament

x- Sooner Sports Television (SSTV) is aired locally on Fox Sports. However the contract allows games to air on various affiliates. Those affiliates are FSSW, FSSW+, FSOK, FSOK+, and FCS Atlantic, Central, and Pacific.

References

Oklahoma
Oklahoma Sooners men's basketball seasons